In mathematical finite group theory, the Thompson transitivity theorem gives conditions under which the centralizer of an abelian subgroup A acts transitively on certain subgroups normalized by A. It originated in the proof of the odd order theorem by , where it was used to prove the Thompson uniqueness theorem.

Statement
Suppose that G is a finite group and p a prime such that all p-local subgroups are p-constrained. If A is a self-centralizing normal abelian subgroup of a p-Sylow subgroup such that A has rank at least 3, then the centralizer CG(A) act transitively on the maximal A-invariant q subgroups of G for any prime q ≠ p.

References

Theorems about finite groups